Gennadiy Belkov (born 24 June 1956) is a retired Uzbekistani high jumper who represented the Soviet Union.

He won the silver medal at the 1979 European Indoor Championships and finished eighteenth at the 1980 European Indoor Championships.

He competed in the men's high jump at the 1980 Summer Olympics.

His personal best jump was 2.32 metres, achieved 29 May 1982 in Tashkent.

References

External links

1956 births
Living people
Uzbekistani male high jumpers
Soviet male high jumpers
Athletes (track and field) at the 1980 Summer Olympics
Olympic athletes of the Soviet Union